Tim Moore (born 18 May 1964 in Chipping Norton, Oxfordshire) is a British travel writer and humourist.  He was educated at Latymer Upper School in Hammersmith. In addition to his nine published travelogues to date, his writings have appeared in various publications including Esquire, The Sunday Times, The Independent, The Observer and the Evening Standard.  He was also briefly a journalist for the Teletext computer games magazine Digitiser, under the pseudonym Mr Hairs, alongside Mr Biffo (aka comedy and sitcom writer Paul Rose.)

His book Frost On My Moustache is an account of a journey in which the author attempts to emulate Lord Dufferin's fearless spirit and enthusiastic adventuring, but comes to identify far more with Dufferin's permanently miserable butler, Wilson, as portrayed in Dufferin's travel book Letters From High Latitudes. The book title refers to a joke Moore retells to his Scandinavian shipmates:  "An Eskimo calls out a repair man to check his car. The mechanic checks under the bonnet and then offers a diagnosis: "Looks like you've blown a seal, mate." "No," says the driver, nervously fingering his upper lip, "it's just frost on my moustache.""

In 2004, Moore presented an ITV programme based on his book Do Not Pass Go, a travelogue of his journey around the locations that appear on a British Monopoly board.

In 2014, Moore released his 9th book, Gironimo! Riding the Very Terrible 1914 Tour of Italy, which recounts his 2012 recreation of the difficult 1914 Giro d'Italia. For the recreation he used a period bicycle and wore a reproduction period costume. The book was featured as Book of the Week on BBC Radio 4 in May 2014.

Personal life

Moore lives in Chiswick, West London with his Icelandic partner Birna Helgadóttir and their three children, Valdís, Kristján and Lilja. He is also a brother-in-law of Agnar Helgason and Asgeir Helgason, and son-in-law of Helgi Valdimarsson.

Bibliography 
 Frost on my Moustache: The Arctic Exploits of a Lord and a Loafer (1999)
 Continental Drifter: Taking the Low Road with the First Grand Tourist (2000) (published in the U.S. as The Grand Tour: The European Adventure of a Continental Drifter)
 French Revolutions: Cycling the Tour de France (2001)
 Do Not Pass Go: From the Old Kent Road to Mayfair (2002)
 Spanish Steps: Travels With My Donkey (2004) (published in the USA as Travels with My Donkey: One Man and His Ass on a Pilgrimage to Santiago)
 Nul Points (2006)
 I Believe in Yesterday: My Adventures in Living History  (2008)
 You are Awful (But I Like You): Travels in Unloved Britain (2012)
 Gironimo! Riding the Very Terrible 1914 Tour of Italy (2014)
 The Cyclist Who Went Out in the Cold: Adventures Along the Iron Curtain (2016)
 Another Fine Mess: Across the USA in a Ford Model T (2018)
 Vuelta Skelter: Riding the Remarkable 1941 Tour of Spain (2021)

References

External links

1964 births
Living people
British male cyclists
Cycling writers
English travel writers
English humorists
English non-fiction outdoors writers
Male touring cyclists
People from Chipping Norton
People from Chiswick